Punjab State Highway 8, commonly referred to as SH 8, is a state highway in the state of Punjab in India. This state highway runs through Patiala district from Patiala to Haryana Border, Punjab on Pehowa highway in the state of Punjab. The total length of the highway is 32 kilometres.

Route description
The route of the highway is Patiala-Bhunarheri-Devigarh-Dudhan-Haryana Border

Major junctions

  National Highway 7 in Patiala

See also
List of state highways in Punjab, India

References 

State Highways in Punjab, India